C. foliata may refer to:
 Cambridgea foliata (L. Koch, 1872), a spider species in the genus Cambridgea in the family Desidae found in New Zealand
 Chrysso foliata (L. Koch, 1878), a spider species in the genus Chrysso found in Russia, China, Korea and Japan

See also
 Foliata (disambiguation)